Čoček (Serbian and Macedonian: чочек, romanized: čoček) is a musical genre and dance that emerged in the Balkans during the early 19th century. It features prominently in the repertoire of many Romani brass bands. 

Čoček originated from Ottoman military bands, which at that time were scattered across the region, mostly throughout Serbia, Bulgaria, Macedonia and Romania. That led to the eventual segmentation and wide range of ethnic sub-styles in čoček. Čoček was handed down through the generations, preserved mostly by Roma minorities, and was largely practiced at village weddings and banquets.

Čoček is especially popular among the Muslim Roma and Albanian populations of Kosovo, South Serbia and Macedonia. When Tanec first came to America in 1956, they performed čoček as a Muslim woman's dance, "Kjupurlika" from Titov Veles.

The kyuchek, as a common musical form in the Balkans (primarily Bulgaria and Macedonia), is typically a dance with a  time signature; two variant forms have the beats divided 2-2-2-3 and 2-2-3-2. (This latter meter is sometimes referred to as "gypsy 9".)

In the international folk dance community, čoček is danced to many melodies. Dances in the čoček genre include Jeni Jol and Sa Sa.

Jazz composer and musician Dave Brubeck was influenced by čoček-type tempos.

See also
Balkan Brass Band

References

European folk dances
Balkan music
Romani dances
Serbian styles of music